Ineabelle Díaz Santana (born January 4, 1974 in Río Piedras) is a Puerto Rican taekwondo practitioner, who competed in the women's welterweight category. She picked up a total of ten medals in her career, including two from the World Taekwondo Championships and a bronze from the 1999 Pan American Games in Winnipeg, Manitoba, Canada. Diaz also competed for Puerto Rico in a demonstration event at the 1992 Summer Olympics in Barcelona, and later attained a fifth-place finish in the 67-kg division at the 2004 Summer Olympics, narrowly missing out the nation's first Olympic medal since 1996.

Diaz made her official debut at the 1992 Summer Olympics in Barcelona, where she trailed behind South Korea's Jeung Eun-ok 1–4 in the 60-kg class during an exhibition taekwondo event. In 1993, she won a bronze medal in the same division at the World Championships in New York City, before suddenly retiring from the sport. Six years later, she came out from an early retirement to pick up another bronze in the 63-kg class at the 1999 Pan American Games in Winnipeg, Manitoba, Canada, but missed her bid for the 2000 Summer Olympics, where taekwondo officially became part of the sporting program.

At the 2004 Summer Olympics in Athens, Diaz returned from a 12-year absence to compete for her Puerto Rican squad in the women's welterweight class (67 kg). Earlier in the process, she sealed a first-place victory over Guatemala's Heidy Juárez and guaranteed a spot on the Puerto Rico Olympic team at the Pan American Olympic Qualifying Tournament in Querétaro, Mexico. She first triumphed by a 4–4 judging decision over Morocco's Mouna Benabderrassoul, before being downed by China's Luo Wei in the semifinals with a score of 3–5. Diaz sought for Puerto Rico's first Olympic medal at these Games, but slipped it away in a 2–5 defeat to Juarez in the repechage rounds, relegating her to fifth.

Rising from Puerto Rico's top Olympic finish in Athens, Diaz put her retirement plans on hold, as she finished behind South Korea's Shin Kyung-hyeon in the heavyweight division at the 2005 World Taekwondo Championships in Madrid, Spain, and then crushed Mexico's Sulayyil Madrigal to earn her last of four golds at the 2006 Central American and Caribbean Games in Cartagena, Colombia.

References

External links

1974 births
Living people
Puerto Rican female taekwondo practitioners
Olympic taekwondo practitioners of Puerto Rico
Taekwondo practitioners at the 1992 Summer Olympics
Taekwondo practitioners at the 2004 Summer Olympics
Pan American Games bronze medalists for Puerto Rico
People from Río Piedras, Puerto Rico
Pan American Games medalists in taekwondo
Central American and Caribbean Games gold medalists for Puerto Rico
Central American and Caribbean Games silver medalists for Puerto Rico
Competitors at the 1990 Central American and Caribbean Games
Competitors at the 1993 Central American and Caribbean Games
Competitors at the 1998 Central American and Caribbean Games
Competitors at the 2002 Central American and Caribbean Games
Competitors at the 2006 Central American and Caribbean Games
Taekwondo practitioners at the 1999 Pan American Games
World Taekwondo Championships medalists
Central American and Caribbean Games medalists in taekwondo
Medalists at the 1999 Pan American Games
21st-century Puerto Rican women